Ole Kirk Kristiansen (7 April 1891 – 11 March 1958) was a Danish carpenter. In 1932, he founded the construction toy company The Lego Group. Over the course of his working life, Kristiansen developed his business from a small woodworking shop that sold household products into a wooden toy manufacturer. In 1934, he named the company Lego and defined its core principles. Lego would eventually transfer to the production of plastic bricks following the purchase of a plastic moulding injection machine in 1947. When Ole died in 1958, the management of the company transferred to his son Godtfred.

Early years
Kristiansen was born in Omvraa Mark, Filskov, South Jutland, Denmark, which is 20 km northwest of Billund. He was the tenth child of an impoverished family in Jutland. His parents were Jens Niels Christiansen and Kirstine Christiansen. Although his family was poor, Kristiansen was able to receive a basic high-school education. It was while he was working as a farmhand from the age of six that Kristiansen developed a fascination with whittling wood, in between the two days per week that he attended school. In 1905, when Kristiansen was 14, he began working as an apprentice for his older brother, Kristian Bonde Christiansen. In 1911 he left Denmark and went to work in carpentry for five years in Germany.

Wood-working business 
In 1916, Kristiansen bought the Billund Woodworking and Carpentry Shop with money he had saved and made profitable sales over the years. During the late 1920s, the business focused on restoring and developing new buildings and also producing household goods for the local community. In 1924, Kristiansen's business was almost destroyed when his sons, Karl Georg and Godtfred, caused a fire to break out after tinkering with wood shavings. Consequently, both the workshop and the family home burned down. Following this event, Kristiansen decided to expand his business and planned the building of a larger workshop with a family apartment. By 1930, Kristiansen employed a small workforce to maintain his growing business.

Family and personal life 
Whilst practicing his trade in Norway, Kristiansen met Kirstine Sørensen, the daughter of a Norwegian cheese-maker, and they subsequently married in 1916 after returning to central Jutland. Together, they had four children named Johannes, Karl Georg, Godtfred and Gerhardt. Kristine died in 1932. Two years later, Kristiansen married Sofie Jörgensen and they had one daughter named Ulla.

Kristiansen was a member of the conservative and pietistic Church Association for the Inner Mission in Denmark.

Beginnings of Lego

During the early 1930s, Kristiansen's business suffered due to the onset of the Great Depression in Denmark. The drop in farming prices resulted in many of his customers being unable to afford his products. This decline in business forced Kristiansen to lay off staff in early 1932 until only seven employees remained. The primary income, which was from sales of ladders and ironing boards, was shrinking in demand. Eventually, Kristiansen had to dismiss his last worker. In order to sell more products, Kristiansen made the decision to produce cheap wooden products, including wooden toys. His business slipped into bankruptcy, but he refused to stop producing toys even when his siblings requested this as part of a bailout loan. He decided to officially found an unnamed company (later to become Lego) in 1932.

Kristiansen's company moved primarily to the production of wooden toys, such as yo-yos, pull-along animals and trucks. In doing so, Kristiansen made the decision to focus his products on the development of children. With this turning point, Kristiansen effectively defined the core philosophy of the company, which would eventually be expressed in its name in 1934. Lego is a shortened form of the Danish word Leg godt, meaning "play well", and the company eventually became known as The Lego Group. Many years later, he said, "Not until the day when I said to myself, 'You must make a choice between carpentry and toys' did I find the real answer."

Kristiansen made his toy products from birch wood that had been cut from the forest, dried out for two years and then dried in a kiln for three weeks. The toys were put together, sealed, sanded and primed before being painted with three coats of varnish. He struggled to sell both his household products and wooden toys due to the poverty levels of people living in the local community. However, he continued to produce the toys, sometimes exchanging them for food. By 1935, the toy range included a variety of animals, including a pull-along wooden duck which has since seen numerous variations.

1940s and 1950s 
Despite hardship, Kristiansen managed to maintain his business through the Great Depression and also Nazi Germany's occupation of Denmark in World War II. In 1942, the company experienced another setback. A short circuit created an electrical fire, which resulted in the loss of his factory and his entire stock and blueprints. The impact of experiencing so many setbacks almost influenced Kristiansen to give up his business. However, he decided to start again, due to a sense of responsibility towards his workforce. In 1944, his new factory now incorporated an assembly line.

At the end of World War II, many traditional materials used in the manufacture of products were not readily available, so manufacturers looked for other cheap, plastic alternatives. In 1947, the Lego company was the first toy manufacturer in Denmark to purchase a plastic injection moulding machine, which was so expensive that it cost more than twice the previous year's profits. This move to producing plastic toys was particularly challenging for Kristiansen, who had spent his life working with wood. By 1949, the business was producing a plastic product called the Automatic Binding Brick. In 1950, Kristiansen's son Godtfred was named junior managing director and the company spent the next decade focusing on the development of the plastic brick, which was modified from a self-locking building brick invented by Hilary Fisher Page. Despite poor sales in the early 1950s, the company persevered in developing its plastic brick by eventually using acrylonitrile butadiene styrene (ABS), thereby achieving the necessary "clutch power" or friction that holds two bricks together. This design for the Lego brick was patented in Copenhagen on 28 January 1958.

Death
On 11 March 1958, Kristiansen experienced a cardiac arrest and died at the age of 66, and his third son Godtfred promptly took over the company until his death in 1995. Ole died just before his son used the Automatic Binding Brick as the basis for the company's "System of Play", which was the foundation of the modern Lego construction toy.

References

Toy inventors
20th-century Danish businesspeople
20th-century Danish inventors
Danish designers
People from Billund Municipality
Lego people
1891 births
1958 deaths